Buddy Williams (5 September 1918 – 12 December 1986), born as Harry Taylor and also known as Harold Williams, was a pioneering Australian country music singer-songwriter, known as "The Yodelling Jackaroo".

Williams was the first Australian to record country music in Australia, three years after the New Zealander Tex Morton made his first recording in Australia. Williams recorded his songs about life and times in the Australian bush. It was with Williams that the bush ballad was first born. Williams's recording of "Give A Little Credit To Dad", complete with trademark yodel, was added to the Sounds of Australia project by the National Film and Sound Archive in Canberra.

Early life
Buddy Williams was born Harry Taylor in the Sydney suburb of Newtown and was soon placed in Glebe Point Orphanage. After many failed escape bids as a child, he was fostered out as a young boy to a dairy-farming family at Dorrigo on the north coast of New South Wales (NSW). It soon became apparent that rather than looking for a new child to bring up, the family was more interested in an unpaid laborer. This was not uncommon in the Depression and post-Depression era where rural child slavery was a fact of life. Times were hard, and life on the farm was tough for young Williams, but it also allowed freedom he never had in the orphanage. He would listen to recordings on an old gramophone of his favourite singers such as Jimmie Rodgers and fell in love with this new music that would become known as country music. At age 15, he ran away from his foster home and began working for other families in the district. He worked at many jobs and started busking around the north coast of NSW, dodging the police who at the time frowned upon such activities.

Career

Buddy Williams made his first recordings in 1938, a  disk. The two songs recorded at this session were "Where The Jacarandas Bloom" and "They Call Me The Clarence River Yodeller". The latter song was re-worked, called "They Call Me The Ramblin' Yodeller" and recorded during his first EMI session on 7 September 1939. These two long-lost recordings were later released on a Kingfisher Records collection in the early 1990s as part of an early Buddy Williams catalogue re-release, which is no longer available.

Williams first sang professionally in 1936 at the Grafton Jacaranda Festival in northern NSW. He also did a guest spot on Grafton's radio station 2GF at the time. He left the town of Grafton and busked his way down the NSW coast before approaching EMI records in Sydney where he gained an audition.

The Page family from Newcastle, who had befriended the young Williams, bought him a black Gibson L-00 acoustic guitar which he used on all his recordings during the 1940s. This guitar was accidentally destroyed while on tour in the late 1940s. Williams later recalled that he had spent his entire life trying to find a replacement guitar that had the same sound quality of his old Gibson, but he never found one. Some of the guitars Williams used during his career included Gibson Hummingbird, Gibson Country and Western, Gibson J-200, and Martin D 28.

On 7 September 1939, he recorded six songs for the Regal Zonophone label. In September 1939, Australia entered WWII and Williams enlisted in the army. During the war years, many of Williams's recording sessions were done while on leave from active service. In the final days of WWII he was seriously wounded during the battle of Balikpapan and was not expected to live. He was recommended for the Military Medal and carried the mass of scars from his injuries for the rest of his life.

In 1948 Williams starred in a short film titled He Chased The Chicken which featured live performances of two of his recordings, "The Overlander Trail" and "The Chicken Song". The studio versions of these songs had been recorded in 1946. Another live song in the film titled "Dear Little Lady of Mine" was never recorded nor released on record. Williams was also meant to appear in the 1946 Australian movie "The Overlanders" with Chips Rafferty, but was unable to obtain leave from the army at the time.

After the war was over and he had recovered from his injuries, he set about forming a travelling rodeo tent show. He eventually wound back his rodeo and tent show after many years and then toured for 11 months of each year with the Buddy Williams Variety Show.

Though Williams performed mostly in country towns and outback communities, having once commented that during his long touring career he had performed in just about every country town in Australia, he also performed a small number of shows in major cities. During 1940 he played the Theatre Royal, Sydney alongside Roy Rene and Evie Hayes. He also did an eight-week stint at Brisbane's Theatre Royal. In 1973 he played Sydney's Hordern Pavilion for the UNICEF concert alongside big-name American acts such as Tex Ritter and Wanda Jackson. In the early 1980s, Williams did a small number of Sydney shows including shows at the Auburn Baseball Club, the Seven Hills RSL Club, and a show at the Star Hotel in the heart of China Town Sydney attended by Australian 1950s and 1960s rocker Col Joye.

Williams suffered the first of two massive heart attacks while on stage in the late 1970s. During one of these hospital stays, he received a call from a lifelong fan called Bert Newton, an Australian television icon. The pair became firm friends and Williams later appeared on live Australian TV on the Bert Newton Show, singing "The Overlander Trail" with guitar accompaniment.

In addition to constant touring, Williams continued to record. During 1965, he moved to RCA records where he became a Gold Record recording artist and recorded a large number of albums. In 1977, Williams was inducted into the Australian Roll of Renown In 1980, he won the first Heritage Award at the Tamworth Country Music Festival for his song "What A Dreary Old World It Would Be".

In 1978, Buddy Williams was the subject of a documentary titled The Last of the Fair Dinkum Outback Entertainers, narrated by his good friend John Singleton. It had a film crew travel with Williams during one of his far North Queensland tours.  At the time, Singleton was a well-known radio station disk jockey and advertising executive. Singleton regularly featured Williams's songs on his radio shows in the late 1970s and early 1980s. Singleton also became a regular face in the crowd at many of Williams's shows.

Williams's last recordings were made months before his death in 1986, when he was sick with terminal cancer, and released posthumously.

A number of artists have recorded Williams's songs, including Rick and Thel Carey who recorded an album of his songs. The Le Garde Twins who toured with Williams also recorded a number of his songs, as did Rex Dallas, Slim Dusty, Nev Nichols, Lindsay Butler and more recently Ashley Cook, who recorded a complete album of Williams's songs.

During the 1970s, North American country music superstar Wilf Carter also recorded a number of Williams's songs on an album of Australian songs. A number of tribute songs have been recorded by many artists including John Williamson whose song "The Last of the Pioneers" is a tribute to Williams and his contribution to Australian music.

In the early 1970s Williams gave the young Australian guitarist Tommy Emmanuel a start in his band. Emmanuel toured with Williams and was a regular session musician for him.

Williams died in 1986 and is buried in Brisbane's Lutwyche Cemetery along with his second wife Grace and their daughter Donita, who had died in 1948 after being accidentally run over by a truck driven by one of the rodeo riders in Williams's show.

Personal life

Williams married Bernie Burnett in 1940. They met at the Grafton Jacaranda Festival when Burnett was 13 and Williams was 17. They made several recordings together, including "Stockmen in Uniform" and "Let's Grow Old Together". They later divorced.

Discography

Albums

Extended plays

Singles

Compilation albums and special releases

Awards and nominations

Australian Roll of Renown
The Australian Roll of Renown honours Australian and New Zealander musicians who have shaped the music industry by making a significant and lasting contribution to Country Music. It was inaugurated in 1976 and the inductee is announced at the Country Music Awards of Australia in Tamworth in January.

|-
| 1977
| Buddy Williams
| Australian Roll of Renown
|

Country Music Awards of Australia
The Country Music Awards of Australia (CMAA) (also known as the Golden Guitar Awards) is an annual awards night held in January during the Tamworth Country Music Festival, celebrating recording excellence in the Australian country music industry. They have been held annually since 1973.

|-
| 1980
| What a Dreary Old World It Would Be
| Heritage Award
|

Tamworth Songwriters Awards
The Tamworth Songwriters Association (TSA) is an annual songwriting contest for original country songs, awarded in January at the Tamworth Country Music Festival. They commenced in 1986. Buddy Williams won two awards.
 (wins only)
|-
| 1987
| Buddy Williams
| Special Award
| 
|-
| 1993
| Buddy Williams
| Songmaker Award
|

Publications

References

Further reading

External links
 Listen to excerpts of "Give a Little Credit to your Dad" and "Lonesome for You, Mother Dear" on australianscreen online
 "Give a Little Credit to your Dad" and "Lonesome for You, Mother Dear" were added to the National Film and Sound Archive's Sounds of Australia registry in 2007.

1918 births
1986 deaths
Australian buskers
Australian country singers
Burials at Lutwyche Cemetery
20th-century Australian male singers
Yodelers
Australian military personnel of World War II